Danny Lippens (born 18 September 1961) is a former Belgian racing cyclist. He rode in 1989 Tour de France.

References

External links
 

1961 births
Living people
Belgian male cyclists
People from Eeklo
Cyclists from East Flanders